The Welsh Rugby Union Division Three East (also called the SWALEC Division Three South East for sponsorship reasons) is a rugby union league in Wales.

Competition format and sponsorship

Competition
There are 12 clubs in the WRU Division Three South East. During the course of a season (which lasts from September to May) each club plays the others twice, once at their home ground and once at that of their opponents for a total of 22 games for each club, with a total of 132 games in each season. Teams receive four points for a win and two point for a draw, an additional bonus win is awarded to either team if they score four tries or more in a single match. No points are awarded for a loss though the losing team can gain a bonus point for finishing the match within seven points of the winning team. Teams are ranked by total points, then the number of tries scored and then points difference. At the end of each season, the club with the most points is crowned as champion. If points are equal the tries scored then points difference determines the winner. The team who is declared champion at the end of the season is eligible for promotion to the WRU Division Two East. The two lowest placed teams are relegated to the WRU Division Four South East.

Sponsorship 
In 2008 the Welsh Rugby Union announced a new sponsorship deal for the club rugby leagues with SWALEC valued at £1 million (GBP). The initial three year sponsorship was extended at the end of the 2010/11 season, making SWALEC the league sponsors until 2015. The leagues sponsored are the WRU Divisions one through to seven.

 (2002-2005) Lloyds TSB
 (2005-2008) Asda
 (2008-2015) SWALEC

2011/2012 Season

League teams
 Aberdare RFC
 Brecon RFC
 Dowlais RFC
 Fairwater RFC
 Gwernyfed RFC
 Llanishen RFC
 Nelson RFC
 Penarth RFC
 Pentyrch RFC
 Rhiwbina RFC
 St. Peters RFC
 Tonyrefail RFC

2011/2012 table

2010/2011 Season

League teams
 Abercynon RFC
 Aberdare RFC
 Brecon RFC
 Dowlais RFC
 Fairwater RFC
 Gwernyfed RFC
 Heol y Cyw RFC
 Llandaff North RFC
 Llanishen RFC
 Pentyrch RFC
 St. Peters RFC
 Taffs Well RFC

2010/2011 table

2009/2010 Season

League teams
 Aberdare RFC
 Brecon RFC
 Fairwater RFC
 Heol y Cyw RFC
 Llandaff RFC
 Llandaff North RFC
 Llanishen RFC
 Penarth RFC
 Pentyrch RFC
 St. Peters RFC
 Treherbert RFC
 Tylorstown RFC

2009/2010 Table

2008/2009 Season

League teams
 Aberdare RFC
 Brecon RFC
 Fairwater RFC
 Llandaff North RFC
 Llanishen RFC
 Llantwit Fardre RFC
 Nantymoel RFC
 Old Illtydians RFC
 Penarth RFC
 St. Peters RFC
 Treorchy RFC
 Tylorstown RFC

2008/2009 Table

1Llandaff North deducted 6 points for fielding an ineligible player

2007/2008 Season 
At the end of the season Bedlinog were crowned champions and gained promotion to the Division Two East league, along with second placed Gilfoch Goch. Tonyrefail and Heol Y Cyw were relegated to Division Four South East.

League table
 Bedlinog RFC
 Brecon RFC
 Fairwater RFC
 Gilfach Goch RFC
 Heol y Cyw RFC
 Llantwit Fardre RFC
 Old Illtydians RFC
 Penarth RFC
 St. Peters RFC
 Tonyrefail RFC
 Treorchy RFC
 Tylorstown RFC

2007/2008 Table

2006/2007 Season

League table
 Brecon RFC
 Fairwater RFC
 Gilfach Goch RFC
 Hirwaun RFC
 Llanishen RFC
 Penarth RFC
 Pencoed RFC
 Pentyrch RFC
 St. Peters RFC
 Tonyrefail RFC
 Treorchy RFC
 Tylorstown RFC

2006/2007 Table

References

5